

Incumbents
President: Juan Manuel Santos (until August 7), Iván Duque Márquez (starting August 7)
Vice President: Oscar Naranjo (until August 7), Marta Lucia Ramirez (starting August 7)

Events

 February 9–25: Colombia at the 2018 Winter Olympics - Four athletes from Colombia compete at the 2018 Winter Olympics.
 July 3: Colombia are knocked out of the 2018 FIFA World Cup in the second round, losing on penalties to England at the Otkritie Arena, Moscow.
 October 6–18: Colombia will compete at the 2018 Summer Youth Olympics.
 11 October - A mudslide in the central Colombian town of Marquetalia results in at least 12 deaths.

Deaths
August 2: Herbert King, 55, television and film actor (heart attack)

References

 
2010s in Colombia
Years of the 21st century in Colombia
Colombia